The mountain gazelle (Gazella gazella), also called the True Gazelle or the Palestine Mountain Gazelle, is a species of gazelle widely but unevenly distributed.

Description 
Mountain gazelle are one of the few mammals in which both sexes have horns. Males have significantly larger horns with rings around them. Females will also have horns, but they will be thinner, smoother and shorter. Along with the horns, mountain gazelle are also sexually dimorphic in size, with males being larger than females. A mature male can range from 17 to 29.5 kg, while females are 16–25 kg in weight.

Population and range
Mountain gazelle are most abundant in Israel, the West Bank in Palestine, and the Golan Heights in southern Syria, but are also found in parts of Jordan and Turkey. There are no accurate estimates on the number of individuals remaining in the wild; Israel’s Parks and Nature authority estimated there to be just over 3,000 individuals in the country,  with less than 3,000 believed to survive outside of Israel, the West Bank and the Golan Heights.

Habitat 
Gazelle have adapted to live in dry, arid conditions. A large amount of their moisture needs are obtained through the vegetation they consume, though they cannot go very long without water. They spend most of their time at the flat tops and crests of mountains, hills, and valleys. Adapting to an annual average temperature of 21-23 °C, gazelles prefer to bed on breezy, elevated areas to avoid the heat of the day. Around dawn and dusk, these antelope will be found cautiously traversing the hills to eat in light forests, fields, or rocky plateaus.
Given their preference for elevation, it seems they are less adapted to hot, dry conditions than other ungulates, like the Dorcas gazelle; this diminutive antelope appears to have outcompeted the mountain gazelle throughout some of its range in the late Holocene era, during a period of climatic warming.

Ecology 
The mountain gazelle is a crepuscular species; they are awake most of the day and sleep most of the night, but generally are always active in the early morning hours and around sunset. They are also very territorial within their herds, and typically stay in groups of three to eight individuals. There are two main herd-types in the mountain gazelle community, namely mother/baby “maternity” herds and bachelor male herds; older, solitary males patrol and stake out territories, as well.

Survival and reproduction 
In the wild, mountain gazelle rarely survive past the age of eight, but can live up to 15 years in captivity with adequate care. By 12 months, a female gazelle can begin breeding. For males, 18 months is when they will start breeding. Being polygamous, and not spending their lives with only one partner, the mountain gazelle typical breeding season is during the early winter months. Females will give birth to one offspring per year, mostly around the months of April and May. A few days prior to giving birth, the mother will leave her herd for a time, and live in solitude. Upon its birth, the newborn is especially vulnerable to predation. For up to two months, the mother and her offspring will stay by themselves, the mother keeping her baby well-hidden in vegetation while she forages. The baby will not typically accompany their mother to graze for several weeks, relying solely on camouflage and lying perfectly still to avoid detection by carnivores. Upon her return, the mother watches out diligently for threats. Some predators include golden eagles, feral dogs, foxes, golden jackals, Arabian wolves and, in some areas, Arabian and Anatolian leopards. While young males will stay with their mother for only six months before departing to a herd of young males, young females will sometimes join their mother in the females’ herd.

Food 
Grasses and shrubs are the gazelle’s most frequent source of food, with grazing being their preferred method of foraging. They are known to browse on low-hanging branches and young shoots as well, especially when their range encompasses that of the acacia tree. They can survive for long periods of time without a water source. Instead, they acquire water from succulent plants and dew droplets.

History
The mountain gazelle underwent a series of size changes during the late Pleistocene, being smallest during the early and middle Epipalaeolithic, and reaching their largest size in the early Late Epipalaeolithic. They then slightly shrunk before stabilizing in size, in the middle Pre-Pottery Neolithic. In the early and late Natufian, human impacts (such as hunting and living in more permanent settlements) may have driven gazelle numbers down enough so as to provide  more food to each animal, thus increasing average body size. Later, the greater stability of food and water from agriculture and the avoidance of humans and livestock by gazelles may have similarly reduced population size and intraspecific competition for the gazelles and allow individual animals to grow larger on average.

In 1985, a large population of mountain gazelles built up through game conservation in two Israeli reserves, in the southern Golan Heights and Ramat Yissachar, was decimated by foot and mouth disease. To prevent such occurrences, a plan was drawn up to stabilize the female population at 1,000 in the Golan and 700 in Ramat Yissachar.

Threats and conservation 
Mountain gazelles were hunted throughout Israel because they were thought of as a pest until 1993. Their numbers are still low for multiple reasons. In some areas, they face predation from feral dogs and jackals. They also face poachers for their skin, meat, and horns. As with other animals, mountain gazelles are harmed by road accidents, habitat degradation, and habitat fragmentation. Mountain gazelles are now a legally protected species, but often there is not enough enforcement to protect the species. Although the range of the gazelle was once extensive, most mountain gazelles are now found in Israel. In 1985, the gazelle population was approximately 10,000, and in 2016 the population had declined to 2,500.

Mountain gazelles are being bred for release in the Gazelle valley, Jerusalem.

The West Bank Segregation Wall, which was built by Israel between 2000 and 2005, poses a great ecological conundrum at it separates populations of many indigenous species on both sides. The Mountain Gazelle is one of these.

Subspecies
The Hatay mountain gazelle lives on the northern Syrian border and a population has been discovered in the Hatay Province of Turkey.

Historically, some others such as the Cuvier's gazelle (G. cuvieri) were included as a subspecies, but recent authorities consistently treat them as separate species.

References

External links

Mammal watching in Israel
 Mountain gazelle (Gazella gazella) images
Jerusalem gazelles get guaranteed home after 10-year battle

Gazella
Mammals of the Middle East
Mammals described in 1766
Taxa named by Peter Simon Pallas